Sadeq Amin Abu Rass (born 1952) is the Chairperson of the Sanaa-based General People’s Congress. Sadeq Rass was named the GPC’s Leader on January 7, 2018, following previous leader Ali Abdullah Saleh’s death on December 4, 2017, during the Battle of Sanaa. Sadeq Rass had served as an Agriculture Minister before his appointment, as Governor of Taiz Governorate, and in the Republic of Yemen Armed Forces. He was wounded in the June 2011 assassination attempt on President Ali Abdullah Saleh and was taken to Saudi Arabia for treatment during the Yemeni revolution. Several leaders of the GPC later rejected his appointment.

References 

Living people
General People's Congress (Yemen) politicians
Yemeni military personnel
People from Al Jawf Governorate
Governors of Taiz Governorate
1952 births
21st-century Yemeni politicians
Local administration ministers of Yemen
Agriculture ministers of Yemen